Hemitelestus is a genus of beetles in the family Carabidae, containing the following species:

 Hemitelestus hova Alluaud, 1897
 Hemitelestus interruptus (Brulle, 1835)

References

Pterostichinae